Annika Meyer (born 30 May 1994) is a Danish handball player who currently plays for SG BBM Bietigheim.

References

1994 births
Living people
People from Haderslev Municipality
Danish female handball players
Sportspeople from the Region of Southern Denmark